Trade promotion may stand for:

 Trade promotion (marketing), a marketing technique aimed at increasing demand for products in retail stores
 Trade promotion (international trade), public policies aimed at increasing a country's or a company's exports